Ballyteigue or Ballyteige is a national nature reserve of approximately  located in County Clare, Ireland. It is managed by the Irish National Parks & Wildlife Service.

Features
Ballyteigue, also known as Ballyteige, was legally protected as a national nature reserve by the Irish government in 1986. It has also been designated a Special Area of Conservation.

Ballyteigue is composed of five parcels of wet meadow heath or molinia meadows. The land is managed using traditional hay-making techniques which maintain the wet meadows as examples of a habitat that is typical of the region. There is a large number of marsh orchids. Irish hare, snipe, common frogs, and orange tip butterflies are endemic to the reserve.

References

Geography of County Clare
Nature reserves in the Republic of Ireland
Tourist attractions in County Clare
Special Areas of Conservation in the Republic of Ireland